"Mr Ego (Take Me Down)" is a song and an EP made by the German power metal band Helloween taken from the album Master of the Rings. It is "dedicated" to former Helloween's singer, Michael Kiske.

It was released in some countries as Mr Ego (Take Me Down). In Japan, it was released as Where the Rain Grows.

Single track listing

Japanese Version

Personnel
Andi Deris – vocals
Roland Grapow – lead and rhythm guitars
Michael Weikath – lead and rhythm guitars
Markus Grosskopf – bass guitar
Uli Kusch – drums

References

1994 EPs
Helloween albums